Eupithecia hamleti is a moth in the family Geometridae. It is found in Armenia.

References

Moths described in 1985
hamleti
Moths of Asia